Polish–Romanian relations are foreign relations between Poland and Romania.

Both countries established diplomatic relations on 22 June 1919. 
In recent years government representatives of Poland and Romania regularly exchange high-level visits, a reflection of the mutual interest in bilateral cooperation between the two countries.

Both are full members of NATO and of the European Union and are the two most populous nations to join either bloc since the end of the Cold War. Both are also members of the Bucharest Nine, the Three Seas Initiative, the OSCE and the Council of Europe.

Poland has given full support to Romania's membership in the European Union and NATO.

History

Beginnings
The beginnings of Polish influence in Romania can be traced back to the 14th century with the founding of the Principality of Moldavia. Trade between the Baltic and Black Seas between the two neighboring countries facilitated their growing bond. During this era Moldavia was a vassal state of first the Kingdom of Poland and later the Polish–Lithuanian Commonwealth several times.

Polish–Romanian alliance

Beginning in 1921, a series of treaties were signed in the interwar period by the Second Polish Republic and the Kingdom of Romania which created the Polish–Romanian alliance. The treaties formed a basis for good foreign relations between the two countries that lasted until World War II began in 1939. Both countries shared a common border in the interbellum, before the Soviet Union invaded and eventually annexed eastern Poland and northeastern Romania following the German-Soviet Molotov–Ribbentrop Pact.

Romanian Bridgehead

After the invasion of Poland which started the Second World War, up to 120,000 Polish troops withdrew through the Romanian Bridgehead area to neutral Romania and Hungary. The majority of those troops joined the newly formed Polish Armed Forces in the West in France and the United Kingdom in 1939 and 1940. Because of their escape through Romania, the Polish army was one of the largest forces of the Allies prior to the United States entering the war and Germany's attack on the Soviet Union (Operation Barbarossa). Also 25,000 civilian refugees fled from Poland to Romania.

In mid-September 1939, despite German and Soviet pressure and Romania's declared neutrality, the Romanians agreed to transport evacuated Polish gold through Romanian territory to the port of Constanța, from where it was further evacuated via Turkey to Polish-allied France. When the German ambassador to Romania, Wilhelm Fabricius, protested Romania's violation of neutrality, Romanian Foreign Minister Grigore Gafencu pretended to know nothing about the transport of Polish gold, only promising to "carry out a proper investigation." The evacuation was successful. Romania's stance infuriated the Germans, and Fabricius threatened Minister Gafencu that Romania had "committed a grave breach of neutrality, which should never happen again."

During the war, ten Polish elementary schools and seven high schools were established for Polish refugee children in Romania, including in Călimănești, Ploiești and Târgoviște. Some young Poles then left Romania for France in 1940 to join the Polish Army in France and continue the fight against Germany. In the second half of 1940, because of the German danger, some Polish refugees were evacuated from Romania to Cyprus.

Modern relations

Since 2017, a Polish military contingent has been stationed in Romania and a Romanian military contingent has been stationed in Poland as part of the NATO Tailored Forward Presence and Enhanced Forward Presence defense forces, respectively.

In October 2021, Poland sent medical equipment and medics to help fight the COVID-19 pandemic in Romania.

Commercial ties
Trade between Romania and Poland in 2016 reached a record value of €4.86 billion according to statistics issued by the Polish Ministry of Economic Development. 

The 2020 Women Leadership Forum (WLF) was held in Warsaw on March 4–5 with the goal of strengthening bilateral cooperation between Poland and Romania, emphasizing the role of women in politics, economy, and education.  Organized by the Embassy of Romania in Poland, the Polish–Romanian Bilateral Chamber of Commerce and Industry and the Romanian Institute of Culture, the event was held under the honorary patronage of Her Royal Highness Margaret, the Guardian of the Crown of Romania, who at the invitation of the Romanian Embassy came to Warsaw for the event with her husband - His Royal Highness Radu, Prince of Romania.

Resident diplomatic missions 
 Poland has an embassy in Bucharest.
 Romania has an embassy in Warsaw.

Polish diaspora in Romania

Poles in Romania form an officially recognised national minority, having one seat in the Chamber of Deputies of Romania, currently held by the Union of Poles of Romania. Poles in Romania have access to Polish elementary schools and cultural centers which are referred to as "Polish Homes".

See also  
 Foreign relations of Poland 
 Foreign relations of Romania
 Bucharest Nine
 Polish–Romanian alliance
 Poles in Romania
 Romanians in Poland

References

External links
 Polish embassy in Bucharest
 Romanian embassy in Warsaw

 

 
Romania
Bilateral relations of Romania